Nigel John Patrick Donohue (born 1969) is a male retired British judoka and wrestler.

Wrestling career
Donohue represented England and won a bronze medal in the 52 kg flyweight, at the 1986 Commonwealth Games in Edinburgh, Scotland.

Judo career
Donohue was better known for his participation in judo and competed at the 1992 Summer Olympics and the 1996 Summer Olympics.  He was also the champion of Great Britain, winning the British Judo Championships in 1992.

Achievements

References

External links
 

1969 births
Living people
British male judoka
Judoka at the 1992 Summer Olympics
Judoka at the 1996 Summer Olympics
Olympic judoka of Great Britain
Wrestlers at the 1986 Commonwealth Games
Commonwealth Games competitors for England